Mordellistena longula is a species of beetle in the genus Mordellistena of the family Mordellidae, which is part of the superfamily Tenebrionoidea. It was described in 1928. It is known from Japan.

References

Beetles described in 1928
longula